Euchloe penia, the eastern greenish black-tip,  is a butterfly in the family Pieridae. It is found in North Macedonia, Bulgaria, Greece, Turkey, Lebanon, Syria and northern Iraq. The habitat consists of dry and warm rocky areas.

The wingspan is 32–36 mm.
Adults are bright greenish off yellow. There are two generations per year, with adults on wing in April and from June to July.

The larvae feed on Matthiola species including M. tessela and M. fruticulosa.

Subspecies
Euchloe penia penia
Euchloe penia taleschicus Back & Leestmans, 2001
Euchloe penia thessalica (Mezger, 1936)

References

Butterflies described in 1805
Euchloe